Manohar Gowardhan Chandrikapure is an Indian politician and a member of the 14th Maharashtra Legislative Assembly elected from the Arjuni-Morgaon constituency in the 2019 Maharashtra Legislative Assembly election. He is a member of Nationalist Congress Party.

Early life
Chandrikapure was born to Govardhan Chandrikapure and hails from the village of Bamhani of Sadak Arjuni taluka in Gondia district of Maharashtra. He studied Higher Secondary in 1971-72 under HSC Board, Nagpur from Adarsh College, Amgaon. He is a Bachelor of Science which he completed from College of Agriculture, Nagpur in March 1975.

Political career
In 2019, he won from Arjuni-Morgaon seat as a Nationalist Congress Party (NCP) candidate, defeating two-time winner Rajkumar Badole of BJP.

References

1950s births
Living people
Maharashtra MLAs 2019–2024
Nationalist Congress Party politicians from Maharashtra
People from Gondia district